Bengt Helge Ljungquist (20 September 1912 – 15 July 1979) was a Swedish fencer, equestrian and military officer.

Early life
Ljungquist was born on 20 September 1912 in Umeå, Sweden, the son of Major Helge Ljungquist and his wife Edith Palander. Ljungquist began riding at the age of ten. He passed studentexamen in Stockholm in 1931.

Military career
In 1934 he received his cavalry commission, which he resigned in 1939, along with many of his fellow officers, to fight in the Winter War for Finland in its two-year conflict with the invading Soviet Union. Ljungquist also attended the Royal Swedish Army Staff College between 1938 and 1940 and then served as a General Staff Corps aspirant. Ljungquist was promoted to Lieutenant in the Life Regiment Hussars (K 3) in 1936 and became ryttmästare in 1943. He then served as a teacher at Military Academy Karlberg from 1944 to 1948 and as a military instructor in Ethiopia from 1948 to 1950. Ljungquist was commanding officer of the Swedish Cavalry Cadet School (Kavalleriets kadettskola, KavKS) from 1950 to 1954 when he was promoted to Major. In 1955, he was appointed executive officer of the Life Guards Squadron (K 1). As part of his military duties, Ljungquist organized the equestrian competition at the 1956 Stockholm Olympic Games. Four years later, Ljungquist was promoted to Lieutenant Colonel and appointed executive officer of the Life Regiment Hussars (K 3). He retired from the military in 1967.

Sports career

He competed in various fencing events at the 1936, 1948, 1952 and 1956 Olympics and won a silver and bronze in the team épée in 1948 and 1952. In 1964 he took part only in mixed dressage events and finished fifth with the Swedish team.

At the world fencing championships Ljungquist won four silver and two bronze medals in the épée in 1937–1954.

During a visit with his sister to the 1968 Summer Olympics in Mexico City, he made a trip to the United States that sparked his interest in furthering dressage. He later became a United States Equestrian Team coach. As a United States Equestrian Team coach, Ljungquist guided the US dressage team to a bronze medal at the 1976 Summer Olympics and a gold medal at the 1975 Pan American Games. He was inducted into the United States Dressage Federation Hall of Fame in 1998.

Personal life
In 1942, Ljungquist married Märta Thorén (born 1915), the daughter of Captain Gösta Thorén and Märta Bernström. He was the dather of Ewa (born 1943), Sten (born 1944) and Ulf (born 1947).

Death
He died on 15 July 1979 Förslöv, Sweden while on a visit from the United States.

Dates of rank
193? – Second lieutenant
1936 – Lieutenant
1943 – Ryttmästare
1954 – Major
1959 – Lieutenant colonel

Awards and decorations

Swedish
  Knight of the Order of the Sword
 Skaraborg County Schooting Association's Gold Medal (Skaraborgs skytteförbunds guldmedalj)
 Swedish Equestrian Badge of Honor (Svensk ridsports hederstecken)
 Swedish Fencing Association's Gold Medal (Svenska fäktförbundet EtoGM)

Foreign
  Knight 1st Class of the Order of the White Rose of Finland
  Knight of the Order of Orange-Nassau
  Knight 1st Class of the Order of St. Olav
   Honorary Lieutenant of the Royal Victorian Order (June 1956)
  4th Class of the Order of the Cross of Liberty with Swords
 Finnish War Commemorative Medal
 Finnish Commemorative Cross on the occasion of the Finnish War 1939-45
 Medal of Honour for Physical Education, silver (Médaille d'Honneur de l'Education Physique)

Honours
Member of the Samfundet SHT
Member of the Rotary International
Member of the United States Dressage Federation Hall of Fame (1998)

See also
Dual sport and multi-sport Olympians

References

External links
 

1912 births
1979 deaths
Swedish Army colonels
Swedish male épée fencers
Swedish dressage riders
Olympic fencers of Sweden
Olympic equestrians of Sweden
Swedish male equestrians
Fencers at the 1936 Summer Olympics
Fencers at the 1948 Summer Olympics
Fencers at the 1952 Summer Olympics
Fencers at the 1956 Summer Olympics
Equestrians at the 1964 Summer Olympics
Olympic silver medalists for Sweden
Olympic bronze medalists for Sweden
Olympic medalists in fencing
People from Umeå
Medalists at the 1948 Summer Olympics
Medalists at the 1952 Summer Olympics
Volunteers in the Winter War
Ethiopian military personnel